Daniel Joseph Brown (August 26, 1925 – June 17, 1995) was an American football defensive end in the National Football League for the Washington Redskins.  He played college football at Villanova University and was drafted in the eleventh round of the 1950 NFL Draft.

References

1925 births
1995 deaths
American football defensive ends
Players of American football from Philadelphia
Villanova Wildcats football players
Washington Redskins players